Pierre Johannes Uys  (born 5 February 1976) is a South African former rugby union player.

Playing career
Uys began his representative career with  Under 21s and made his senior provincial debut for Free State in 1998.

Uys played one test match for the Springboks, the test against  during the 2002 end-of-year tour of Europe.

Test history

See also
List of South Africa national rugby union players – Springbok no. 738

References

1976 births
Living people
South African rugby union players
South Africa international rugby union players
Free State Cheetahs players
Griquas (rugby union) players
Pumas (Currie Cup) players
Western Province (rugby union) players
Bulls (rugby union) players
Stormers players
Rugby union flankers
Rugby union players from the Western Cape